Cumberland is a city in Barron County in the U.S. state of Wisconsin. The population was 2,170 at the 2010 census. The city is located partially within the Town of Cumberland. It was incorporated in 1885.

History
Cumberland is often called the “Island City” and the main part of the city, including the original settlement, is located on land surrounded by Beaver Dam Lake, originally settled by Chippewa Indian Tribe.  Beaver Dam Lake was referred to as Che-wa-cum-ma-towangok or “Lake Made by the Beavers,” by the local tribe. The Chief of the Chippewa Tribe was Pon-gee Rau-gen, or “Little Pipe”. He continued to live in the area even after it was settled by European settlers and drowned in a canoe on Beaver Dam Lake in 1895.  In 1874, A. Ritan and R. H. Clothier explored the area with the intention of settling in there. While exploring, they came across surveyors that informed them of the upcoming railroad line that the North Wisconsin Railway Company planned to lay in the area. A. Ritan, who lived near what is today Turtle Lake and the Dahlby Family, originally of Norwegian descent, from the town of New Richmond, both filed a homestead near the proposed railroad and built two log cabins, 300 feet north of the present high school location. In 1878, the North Wisconsin Railroad Company extended the rail lines through the area. Prior to the railroad, settlers were required to get provisions in Rice Lake, Barron or Clayton. In 1880, the Dahlby Family sold their cabin and moved to Chandler (now known as Spooner) and open a store. A. Ritan, also originally from Norway, lived in Cumberland for many years and helped develop the city before moving to Portland, Oregon. 
 
R. H. Clothier also took a homestead and built a farm in 1875. On December 30, 1875 the town of Lakeside was organized, encompassing what is now Lakeland Township, Almena Township, Crystal Lake Township and Maple Plain Township. During the winter of 1876 a bridge, called Bonett Bridge, was built off the island and soon after a school was located on the mainland area near the bridge with Miss Ida Schofield as the original teacher.  She was soon replaced by Miss Carrie Fay, who arrived from nearby Prairie Farm. On January 1, 1880, the name was changed to Cumberland at the request of John Humbird, who arrived in the area from Cumberland, Maryland. Almena Township joined with the Turtle Lake Township a couple of months later and on November 12, 1902 Crystal Lake became their own Township. In early 1876 a post office, originally called Lakeland, was established three miles east of the city with L.I. Gunderson being named postmaster. On September 10, 1876, Mae Jenet Hodgkin became the first white person born on the island. The first grocery store was opened by David Ingle and Elmer Wisner of Clear Lake opened the first blacksmith shop in 1878. In the winter of 1879 the name was changed to Cumberland. In July 1880, Dr. William Hopkins arrived from Maine and set up a practice. At the time, it was the only practice between Clear Lake, Wisconsin and Lake Superior. Also around this time, a steam sawmill was set up in northern Cumberland, in what is now the "Mill Hill" area and operated for a few years until it was destroyed by fire on August 15, 1884. The Lakeside Cemetery was established in 1880. In 1881, the first newspaper, the Cumberland Herald (later the Cumberland Advocate) began printing. The first bank, the Bank of Cumberland, began operation on October 8, 1883. After the railroad begin to operate, settlers quickly arrived in the area and by 1884 there were 24 saloons located in the area. In 1885 a jail and fire department, with N. D. Richards named the Fire Chief, were established and by the late 1880s the first hotel was kept by Jack Collingwood, followed by several other hotels. Soon the Elm Street Bridge was completed and the Fire Department moved from their Lake Street location to their present location. In February 1893, the state board of health sent a representative to set up a quarantine on the Italian settlement due to unsanitary conditions.  On August 1, 1884 the city borrowed $5,900 via bond issue to establish a system of waterworks which was constructed by Fairbanks, Morse and Company in February 1895. In April of the same year, telephone lines were also erected in the city limits. On September 14, 1895, the newly built water tank burst and damaged several nearby properties. On November 20, 1897 the city approved a resolution to for street lighting of all public grounds by electricity. In 1903 the Uecke's Opera House was opened and still remains today apartment complex.  The same year, a large school was constructed on the island on the present location of the Cumberland Elementary School. On March 15, 1905 a $10,000 donation from Andrew Carnegie established a Carnegie Library in Cumberland. In 1914 the Island City Hospital was created by Dr. George Grinde and included a 20-bed hospital and X-ray facilities.

Geography
Cumberland is located at  (45.535892, −92.023389), along Beaver Dam Lake at the beginning of the Hay River.

Cumberland is along U.S. Highway 63 and Wisconsin Highway 48.

Climate

Demographics

2010 census
As of the census of 2010, there were 2,170 people, 994 households, and 570 families residing in the city. The racial makeup of the city was 95.9% White, 0.5% African American, 1.4% Native American, 0.4% from other races, and 1.7% from two or more races. Hispanic or Latino of any race were 2.5% of the population.

There were 994 households, of which 23.9% had children under the age of 18 living with them, 41.0% were married couples living together, 12.2% had a female householder with no husband present, 4.1% had a male householder with no wife present, and 42.7% were non-families. 36.3% of all households were made up of individuals, and 20.5% had someone living alone who was 65 years of age or older. The average household size was 2.14 and the average family size was 2.76.

The median age in the city was 47.2 years. 20.8% of residents were under the age of 18; 7.4% were between the ages of 18 and 24; 19.8% were from 25 to 44; 27% were from 45 to 64; and 24.9% were 65 years of age or older. The gender makeup of the city was 46.3% male and 53.7% female.

2000 census
As of the census of 2000, there were 2,280 people, 1,013 households, and 607 families residing in the city. The population density was 671.5 people per square mile (258.9/km2). There were 1,134 housing units at an average density of 334.0 per square mile (128.8/km2). The racial makeup of the city was 97.54% White, 0.09% Black or African American, 1.10% Native American, 0.39% Asian, 0.13% from other races, and 0.75% from two or more races. Hispanic or Latino of any race were 0.75% of the population.

The ancestral makeup of the population were 34.2% German, 24.7% Norwegian, 14.1% Italian, 10.3% Irish, 9.6% Swedish and 8.2% English.

There were 1,013 households, out of which 26.4% had children under the age of 18 living with them, 44.7% were married couples living together, 11.7% had a female householder with no husband present, and 40.0% were non-families. 35.1% of all households were made up of individuals, and 19.6% had someone living alone who was 65 years of age or older. The average household size was 2.18 and the average family size was 2.79.

In the city, the population was spread out, with 22.5% under the age of 18, 7.3% from 18 to 24, 23.0% from 25 to 44, 22.9% from 45 to 64, and 24.3% who were 65 years of age or older. The median age was 43 years. For every 100 females, there were 89.8 males. For every 100 females age 18 and over, there were 82.2 males.

The median income for a household in the city was $32,661, and the median income for a family was $41,612. Males had a median income of $34,519 versus $21,304 for females. The per capita income for the city was $18,688. About 9.5% of families and 11.7% of the population were below the poverty line, including 18.6% of those under age 18 and 8.3% of those age 65 or over.

Transportation
Cumberland Municipal Airport (KUBE) is located three miles south of Cumberland.

Recreation
Cumberland is known as "The Island City" because it is nearly surrounded by the waters of Beaver Dam Lake.

Cumberland hosts the "Rutabaga Festival" annually on the weekend preceding Labor Day weekend. The festival features live music, carnival rides, food, a parade, and other events.

Notable people
Jules Alfonse – NFL player
Henry C. Doolittle – Wisconsin State Representative
David Hanson – NHL player
Fred J. Moser – Wisconsin State Representative – educator
Ben Peterson – Olympic gold medalist
John Peterson – Olympic gold medalist
Thomas St. Angelo – Wisconsin State Representative
Sister M. Madeleva Wolff – poet – College President

Images

References

External links

 Cumberland website
 Cumberland Chamber of Commerce
 Thomas St. Angelo Public Library of Cumberland, WI
 Sanborn fire insurance maps: 1893 1899 1909

Cities in Wisconsin
Cities in Barron County, Wisconsin